Strathtulloh is a suburb in Melbourne, Victoria, Australia,  west of Melbourne's Central Business District, located within the City of Melton local government area. Strathtulloh recorded a population of 3,997 at the 2021 census.

The suburb was gazetted by the Office of Geographic Names on 9 February 2017, following a proposal for eleven new suburbs by the City of Melton. The new name officially came into effect on 23 August 2017.

Prior to the suburb's creation, the area was part of Melton South.

Strathtulloh is the name of a heritage-listed property in the suburb, located on Greigs Road.

References

External links

Suburbs of Melbourne
Suburbs of the City of Melton